Shangjie railway station is a railway station of Longhai railway located in Shangjie District, Zhengzhou, Henan, China.

The station is currently out of passenger services.

History 
The station was opened in 1909.

References 

Railway stations in Henan
Railway stations in Zhengzhou
Stations on the Longhai Railway
Railway stations in China opened in 1958
Railway stations in China opened in 1909